Amato's Sandwich Shops, Inc., is a chain of Italian restaurants that serves sandwiches,  pizza and pasta throughout  northern New England, United States. Founded in 1902 by Giovanni Amato, Amato's currently operates 44 stores. Recent expansion has been in the form of franchising. The company also cans its pasta and pizza sauces for sale in Hannaford supermarkets.

Headquartered in Portland, Amato's operates over 44 locations. About half of these are located throughout their home state of Maine. The chain also has a strong presence in Vermont (mostly within Maplefields convenience stores), and there are a handful of other locations within New Hampshire. They have expanded into Massachusetts, having opened four locations in November 2019.

Amato's is best known for its Italian sandwiches. Its most popular menu item, called "The Original Real Italian," was supposedly invented in 1902.

Giovanni named his sandwiches "Italians" in honor of his homeland.  Unlike other sandwich shops they are served with onions, pickles, tomatoes, green peppers and olives with an Amato's fresh baked roll.

History
In 1902, Naples native Giovanni Amato (1875–1959) and his wife, Michelina (1878–1959), opened a store on India Street in Portland, Maine. According to official literature, Amato's sandwiches contained ham, American cheese, and fresh vegetables, which the Italian immigrants along the waterfront seemed to enjoy. Amato named his sandwich the "Italian" in honor of his country and his people (not, as is widely believed, because of its ingredients).

In 1972, Dominic Reali, an employee at the original Amato's on India Street, purchased the store from his boss. Under Reali, the company increased from one store to thirteen, and began franchising.  Today there are 40 locations operating under the Amato's brand.  Dominic Reali also added Greek olives, sour pickles, and his own oil (a blend of olive and vegetable oil) to the famous Real Italian.

Amato's Xpress
In recent years, Amato's has allowed several franchises to operate under the name Amato's Xpress. These locations, found mostly in convenience stores in northern New England, purvey Amato's pizza, pasta, salads, and sandwiches, but fewer specialty items are available. Amato's franchises in Vermont-based Maplefield's gas stations do not use the Amato's Xpress name.

Nearly all Amato's stores have dropped the Xpress moniker as of 2011.

See also
 Portland, Maine cuisine
 List of Italian restaurants

References

External links
 
John F. Amato at the India Street Amato's in April 1959

Restaurants in Portland, Maine
Italian restaurants in the United States
Restaurants established in 1902
American companies established in 1902
1902 establishments in Maine